Sadashiv Dattaray Amrapurkar (11 May 1950 – 3 November 2014) was an Indian actor, best known for his performances in Marathi and Hindi films from 1983 to 1999. He acted in more than 300 movies in Hindi, Marathi, and other regional languages. He also played first class cricket in Ranji trophy.

He received the Filmfare Award for Best Performance in a Negative Role in 1991 for Sadak — the first time the award was instituted. In 1993, he won the Filmfare Award for best actor in a villainous role, when the award was instituted. In 1993 he also played a comic hero, Inspector Pyare Mohan, in Aankhen. In addition to negative roles, he played supporting roles and, later, comic roles.

Early life
Amrapurkar was born as Ganesh Kumar Narwode (or Nalawade) on 11 May 1950, in Amrapur village of Shevgaon tehsil, Ahmadnagar district in Maharashtra.

Amrapurkar began acting during his school days. While completing his master's degree in history at Pune University, he was involved in theatre.

Career
Amrapurkar started his career as an actor in Marathi theatre, eventually acting and directing nearly fifty plays, before transitioning to films. He made his film debut with the role of Bal Gangadhar Tilak in 22 June 1897, a Marathi historical film directed by Jayoo Patwardhan and Nachiket Patwardhan.

He won a number of awards in theatre and film. His first film was Govind Nihalani's  Ardh Satya (1983), for which he won a Filmfare Award. He has acted in more than 300 movies in Hindi, Marathi, Bengali, Oriya, Haryanvi, Telugu and Tamil. In 1993, he won the Filmfare award for Best Actor in a villainous role, the first time this award was instituted.

In 1981–82, Amarapurkar acted in a Marathi stage play, Hands-Up!, alongside stage actors Avinash Masurekar and Bhakti Barve-Inamdar. This play was successful and Amrapurkar was noticed by director Govind Nihalani, who was searching for an actor to play the central negative character in his movie Ardh Satya. The movie went on to be a hit and Amrapurkar's acting was appreciated. His style of dialog delivery was considered unique as compared to the popular Hindi movie villains in those days. Amrapurkar won a Filmfare Award for his performance in the film.

After Ardh Satya, Amarapurkar starred in Purana Mandir, Nasoor, Muddat, Jawaani and Khamosh. In 1986, he starred as the villain in the Amitabh Bachchan-starrer Aakhree Raasta. In 1987, he starred as the main villain in the Dharmendra-starrer Hukumat, which went on to be a blockbuster that grossed even more than Mr. India. From 1988 he increasingly appeared in villainous roles in films such as Mohre, Khatron Ke Khiladi (1988 film), Kaal Chakra, Eeshwar, Elaan-E-Jung, Farishtay, Veeru Dada, Naaka Bandi and Begunaah.

In the mid-1990s he migrated towards supporting roles and comic roles such as in Aankhen, Ishq, Coolie No. 1, Gupt: The Hidden Truth, Aunty No. 1, Jai Hind, Master and Hum Saath-Saath Hain: We Stand United. He played the role of Dr. Khanna in the 1996 film Chhote Sarkar.  He did a number of stunning roles in Marathi films such as Kadachit, Vaastupurush, Doghi, Savarkhed ek Gaav and Ara Ara Aaba Ata tari Thamba.  His last Hindi screen role was a cameo in the short film by Dibakar Banerjee, Bombay Talkies (2012).

He did a cameo in the Waheeda Rehman-starrer Swayam in 1991. He played the role of a tough, upright cop who reprimands his children for leaving an elderly widow to fend for herself on the streets. The film touched on the problems old people face with the breakdown of the joint family system. It was a subject close to Amrapurkar's heart and he did the role for free.

Amrapurkar was a philanthropist, social activist, and was engaged in a number of social organizations such as Samajik Krutadnyata Nidhi, Andhashraddha Nirmulan Samiti, Snehalaya, Lokshahi Prabodhan Vyaspeeth, Ahmednagar Aitihasik Vastu Sangrahalaya, and many others. He always had a soft spot for the rural youth and strove for their development.

In March 2013, he protested water waste during the Holi festival near his residence in Mumbai.

Amrapurkar also lent his support to the Anna Hazare movement in 2011 and was active in engaging citizens during the 2009 Lok Sabha elections by holding several discussions to make voters aware of their rights.

Philanthropy
He was a philanthropist, social activist, and civically engaged in a number of social organizations including:

Maharashtra Samajik Krutadnyata Nidhi: He worked with Narendra Dabholkar, Baba Adhav, and Shreeram Lagoo to raise Rs.50 Lakhs through enactment of the play Lagnachi Bedi in Maharashtra and Goa. This was a fund created to support the social workers who toiled for the betterment of society without asking for anything in return.
Andhashraddha Nirmulan Samiti: He was a trustee and an active participant in the Committee for Eradication of Blind Faith.
Snehalaya, Ahmednagar: He was a trustee for this organization striving for betterment of marginalized women such as prostitutes and their children affected by HIV/AIDS.
Narmada Bachao Andolan: He worked alongside Medha Patkar for the reestablishment of people displaced by the building of the Sardar Sarovar Dam on the banks of the river Narmada.
Lokshahi Prabodhan Vyaspeeth: A non-political, non-denominational platform to create awareness about voter rights and democracy among the common masses.  He held talks and forums to create awareness.
Ahmednagar Aitihasik Vastu Sangrahalaya He raised funds for the Museum of Historical Artifacts of Ahmednagar,
He supported non-profit organizations including the Institute for Psychological Health, Thane; Muktangan Rehabilitation Center, and Pune, through fundraising and mental health awareness.
 He collaborated with the Institute for Psychological Health in Thane to organize VEDH (Vocational Education – Direction and Harmony), a conference for school children, parents and teachers about the latest career options in Ahmednagar, once a year, for a decade.
An ardent reader and a patron of Marathi and Hindi books, he wrote a number of articles on social issues in newspapers and magazines and published books, like Kimayagaar (a play about the life of Helen Keller) and Abhinayaache Saha Path ("Six Lessons in Acting").

After his death in his memory Ahmednagar's Think Global Foundation started giving Late Sadashiv Amarapurkar Award which has become very popular in a short span. Kiran Kale, president of Think Global Foundation conceptualized this initiative. In 2016, the Marathi writer and IT expert Achyut Godbole and social worker and writer Deepa Deshmukh were honored with this award. In 2017, the playback singer Suresh Wadkar was honored with this award by the auspicious hands of the veteran actor Vikram Gokhale.

Illness and death
Amrapurkar developed a lung inflammation in October 2014 resulting in hospitalisation at Kokilaben Dhirubhai Ambani Hospital, where his condition became critical. He died on 3 November 2014, at 64 years old.

Filmfare Awards
 1984: Won: Best Supporting Actor for Ardh Satya
 1991: Won: Best Villain for Sadak
 1998: Nominated: Best Villain for Ishq

Works

Selected plays he directed and acted in:

Pai, Pai an Pai (one-act play, director, actor)
	Bandu, Baby ani Burkha (one-act play, director, actor)
	Jawai Maza Bhala (one-act play, director, actor)
	Bhatala dili Osri (actor)
	Kaka Kishacha (actor)
	Karaila gelo Ek (actor)
	Brahmacha Bhopla (actor)
	Kahi Swapna Vikaichi Aahet (actor, director)
	Yatrik (director, actor)
	Hawa Andhara Kavadsa (actor, director)
     Chhinna (director, actor)
	Chhoo Mantar (actor, director)
	Vitthala (director)
	Me Kumar (director)
	Suryachi Pillay (actor)
	Hands Up (actor)
	Kanyadaan (actor, director)
	Nishpap (director)
	Lagnachi Bedi (actor)
	Akasmat (director, actor)
	Ti Phulrani (actor)
	Jyacha Tyacha Vithoba (director, actor)

He directed some well-known artists like Shanta Jog, Smita Patil, Shreeram Lagoo, Bhakti Barve, Dilip Prabhavalkar, Neena Kulkarni, and Suhas Joshi.

Selected TV series
	Raj Se Swaraj (1989) Lokmanya Tilak
	Bharat Ek Khoj (1990) (Shyam Benegal's work based on the discovery of India) Mahatma Phule
 Kulvadhu  (2009) Marathi serial 
	 Shobha Somnath Ki (2012)

Playback singer
	Hou De Jarasa Ushir (2013)
	Agnikaal (1990)

Books written by him
1.	Kimayaagaar (play based on the life of Helen Keller)
2.	Abhinayache Saha Paath

Selected filmography

Marathi films

References

External links
 
 

1950s births
2014 deaths
Male actors in Hindi cinema
Male actors in Marathi cinema
Indian theatre directors
Male actors in Marathi theatre
People from Ahmednagar
Male actors from Maharashtra
Filmfare Awards winners
20th-century Indian male actors
Respiratory disease deaths in India
Infectious disease deaths in India
Deaths from respiratory tract infection